were couriers in Japan who carried letters, documents, bills of exchange, and packages, using a system of relay stations under the bakufu military governments, beginning in the Kamakura period (1185–1333), gradually yielding to more modern systems beginning in 1858.

Kamakura period

During the Asuka period the government established a system called Five Home Provinces and Seven Circuits, served by messengers known as  who carried special  . This system had broken down by the time of the Kamakura period. The Kamakura shogunate established a relay system (Roppara hikyaku) of horse-riders and stages that would carry messages from the Rokuhara Tandai headquarters (in the Higashiyama area of Kyoto) to Kamakura, sometimes within 72 hours.

Edo period
The hikyaku system reached a degree of sophistication that led to The Japanese Letter-Writing Era, beginning about 1721.

There were many different types of hikyaku, including:
 , only available high-ranking bakufu officials such as Rōjū (elder statesmen), the Kyoto Shoshidai (Kyoto Deputy), the Osaka jōdai (Governor of Osaka Castle), the governor of Sunpu Castle, Kanjō-bugyō (financial magistrates), and others of Bugyō (magistrate) status.
 : couriers established by individual Daimyo (feudal lords) to carry messages between their domains and the domainal residence in Edo, and sometimes also to their rice warehouses in port cities.
 : couriers who carried news about rice prices from the Dōjima Rice Exchange in Osaka to interested parties elsewhere.
: a single runner who carried a message or parcel, without relay, from the sender to the addressee.
 : specialized runners within the Edo Bakufu, much used during the waning years of the Edo Bakufu. With bells jingling from their message boxes, they were called "chirin chirin no machi-bikyaku" by the townsfolk. According to the Morisada Mango of 1837, "Their appearance was thus: the message box was painted in persimmon ink, the courier, place, and official's family name in vermilion ink, this box on a pole slung over the back, with wind chimes dangling from the front end of the pole, warning the crowds when the courier passed through, thus the name chirin chirin no machi-bikyaku."

Appearances in culture
1711. The Courier for Hell  is a love-suicide play by the Japanese writer Chikamatsu Monzaemon.

1949. A motion picture titled Tengu hikyaku (Goblin Courier) was produced by Daiei Film, starring Daisuke Katō.

1999. An episode of the romantic comedy fantasy anime series Trouble Chocolate is titled Run, Hikyaku-kun, in which a small monster named Courier (Hikyaku) appears.

References

Bibliography
 

Transport occupations
Postal services
Cultural history of Japan